Jeferson Antonio Alves Dupin (born October 19, 1972) is a former Brazilian football player.

Club statistics

References

External links

1972 births
Living people
Brazilian footballers
Brazilian expatriate footballers
Expatriate footballers in Japan
J2 League players
Montedio Yamagata players
Association football midfielders